Irreligious organizations promote the view that moral standards should be based solely on naturalistic considerations, without reference to supernatural concepts (such as God or an afterlife), any desire to do good for a reward after death, or any fear of punishment for not believing in life after death.

Background 
Individuals and organizations sharing these views, identify themselves by a variety of terms, including, bright, freethinker, naturalist, rationalist, or skeptic. Despite the use of these various terms, the organizations listed here have goals in common. Note that, while most of these organizations and their members consider themselves irreligious, there are certain exceptions (Ethical Culture, for example).

In some jurisdictions, a provincial or national humanist society may confer upon Humanist officiants the ability to conduct memorial services, child naming ceremonies or officiate marriages — tasks which would be carried out by clergy in most organized religions.

List
Atheist Republic is the world's largest atheist organization with local chapters called consulates all over the world. Their facebook page has over 2.4 million followers.
The Brights' Net is a nonprofit educational organization dedicated to "building a constituency" and "constructively address[ing] the marginalized situation of persons who have a naturalistic worldview."
The Clergy Project provides support, community, and hope to religious professionals who no longer hold supernatural beliefs. 
European Humanist Federation is a union of "numerous humanist organisations from most European countries" whose purpose is to promote humanism and secularism in Europe.
Humanists International is "the sole world umbrella organisation embracing Humanist, atheist, rationalist, secularist, skeptic, laique,  ethical cultural, freethought and similar organisations world-wide." Humanists International is a union of over 100 Humanist or secularist organizations in more than 40 countries. It is an international NGO (non-governmental organization) with special consultative status with the United Nations.
Young Humanists International, Humanists International's youth wing
International League of Humanists
Rationalist International
Sunday Assembly

Australia
Council of Australian Humanist Societies
National Secular Lobby
Rationalist Society of Australia
The Secular Party of Australia

Belgium
Willemsfonds

Brazil
Brazilian Association of Atheists and Agnostics (ATEA)
Secular Humanist League of Brazil

Canada
Centre for Inquiry Canada
Freethought Association of Canada
Humanist Canada, formerly Humanist Association of Canada
Mouvement laïque québécois
Toronto Secular Alliance

Finland
 Union of Freethinkers of Finland, founded the Eroakirkosta.fi web service

France
 Fédération nationale de la libre pensée
 Union rationaliste

Germany
Atheist Refugee Relief
Central Council of Ex-Muslims
German Freethinkers League
Giordano Bruno Foundation (Giordano-Bruno-Stiftung, gbs)
International League of Non-Religious and Atheists (IBKA)
Humanistischer Verband Deutschlands (HVD)
Party of Humanists (Partei der Humanisten)

Iceland
Sidmennt – Icelandic Ethical Humanist Association

India
Indian Rationalist Association
Atheist Center
Dakshina Kannada Rationalist Association
Federation of Indian Rationalist Associations
Indian Humanist Union
Kerala Yukthivadi Sangham
Dravidar Kazhagam
We The Sapiens
Essense club

Indonesia
Indonesian Atheists

Ireland
Atheist Ireland
Humanist Association of Ireland
Humani
Irish Freethinkers and Humanists

Italy
Italian Union of Rationalist Atheists and Agnostics (UAAR)

Kenya
Atheists In Kenya Society (AIK)

Luxembourg 
Allianz vun Humanisten, Atheisten an Agnostiker (AHA!)

Netherlands
De Vrije Gedachte (DVG, "The Free Thought")
Humanistisch Verbond (HV, "Humanist Association")

New Zealand
Humanist Society of New Zealand
New Zealand Association of Rationalists and Humanists
NZ Skeptics

Northern Ireland
Humani

Norway
Human-Etisk Forbund HEF has over 78,000 members, making it "the largest group [in Norway] outside the State Church"
Norwegian Heathen Society

Philippines

Filipino Freethinkers

Romania
Romanian Secular-Humanist Association

Scotland
Humanist Society Scotland
Scottish Secular Society, founded in 2012, identifies itself as Scotland's largest secular group.

Singapore
Humanist Society of Singapore

Sweden
Humanists Sweden

Switzerland 

 Freethinkers Association of Switzerland

Turkey 
Association of Atheism

United Kingdom

National organisations
Humanists UK, founded 1896, is the largest such group. 
Groups like Wales Humanists, Northern Ireland Humanists, Young Humanists, LGBT Humanists UK, Defence Humanists, and Humanist Students are all part of Humanists UK.
Conway Hall Ethical Society, founded in 1793, identifies itself as "the oldest freethought community in the world"
Humanist Society Scotland
Scottish Secular Society
National Secular Society
Rationalist Association, which publishes New Humanist
Camp Quest UK

Local groups
There are many local humanist groups around the United Kingdom, most being affiliates of Humanists UK and the National Secular Society. Of these, Leicester Secular Society has particular claim to fame in being the world's oldest secular society, founded in 1851. Others include North East Humanists.

United States

American Atheists – dedicated to separation of church and state issues
American Ethical Union – a federation of about 25 Ethical Societies representing the Ethical Culture movement founded in 1876 by Felix Adler
American Humanist Association, organization promoting secular humanism in the US
American Secular Union
Americans United for Separation of Church and State is a nonpartisan organization dedicated to preserving church-state separation to ensure religious freedom for all Americans
The Atheist Agenda
Atheist Alliance International 
Atheist Community of Austin
Atheists of Florida founded in 1992 to ensure the separation of state and church
Baptist Joint Committee for Religious Liberty, represents multiple Baptist groups (but not the Southern Baptist Convention) in supporting religious liberty and the separation of church and state
Camp Inquiry, a summer camp run by the Center for Inquiry
Camp Quest, "The Secular Summer Camp", is a residential summer camp in the United States for the children of those who hold a naturalistic world view
Center for Inquiry 
Richard Dawkins Foundation for Reason and Science, former independent project created by Richard Dawkins, now a subdivision of CFI
City Congregation for Humanistic Judaism
Committee for Skeptical Inquiry
Ex-Muslims of North America is a non-profit based in the US, according to its website stands "for the rights and dignities of those who leave Islam"
Fellowship of Humanity
First Humanist Society of New York
Foundation Beyond Belief
Freedom From Religion Foundation, according to its website, is the "largest group of atheists and agnostics in North America"
The Humanist Institute
Institute for Humanist Studies
Internet Infidels is "a nonprofit educational organization dedicated to defending and promoting a naturalistic worldview on the Internet"
Military Association of Atheists & Freethinkers
Military Religious Freedom Foundation
North Texas Church of Freethought
Practice What You Preach Foundation is a "non-profit organization that builds bridges between faith communities and secular organizations in the Greater Los Angeles Area"
Rational Response Squad
Secular Coalition for America
Secular Student Alliance 
Society for Humanistic Judaism offers cultural and secular Jews a non-theistic alternative in contemporary Jewish life
United Coalition of Reason

See also
List of skeptical organizations
Lists of secularists: Agnostics, Atheists, Humanists, Nontheists, Skeptics

Notes and references

External links
Atheists Helping the Homeless, DC
Organizations lists at the Secular Web.

Secularist
 
 
 
 
Secularist organizations
Secularist organizations